This Is What Happens is an album by the New York band The Reign of Kindo. This album is also the last with piano/trumpet player Kelly Sciandra. The band also released an 8-bit digital version of This Is What Happens entitled This Is Also What Happens

Track listing

References 

The Reign of Kindo albums
2010 albums